

Blue Bulls results in the 1998 Currie cup

Statistics

1998 Currie cup log position

1988 - 1998 results summary (including play off matches)

Blue Bulls
1998